Yevhen Lemeshko (11 December 1930 – 2 June 2016) was a Ukrainian football player and coach as well as chairman of the Council of Veteran Footballers.

Club career
Lemeshko started his football career as a player for FC Dynamo Kyiv, but due to an injury he continued his football career as a coach.

International career
In 1956 Lemeshko played couple of games for the Ukraine at the Spartakiad of the Peoples of the USSR.

Coaching career
In 1980, Lemeshko became a Merited Coach of Ukraine.

Death
Lemeshko died on 2 June 2016 at the age of 85.

Personal information
Lemeshko was a father-in-law of Oleh Protasov.

Honors

Coach
Sudnobudivnyk
 Champion of Ukraine: 1974

Metalist Kharkiv
 Champion of Ukraine: 1978
 Champion USSR: 1981
 USSR Cup: 1983, 1988

Torpedo Zaporizhia
 Champion of Ukraine: 1990

References

External links
  Lemeshko only five years younger than Metalist (Obozrevatel, December 14, 2005)
  Brief profile at klisf
  History of Karpaty Lviv
  Interview to the Ukrainian daily "Den" (July 23, 1998)
 
  Interview of Volodymyr Danylyuk when he's mentioning Lemeshko as the coach of Karpaty (Sport-glavred, July 29, 2010)
  Interview of Volodymyr Linke (Metlaist's all-time top scorer) who talks about Lemeshko (March 27, 2008)

1930 births
2016 deaths
Sportspeople from Mykolaiv
Soviet footballers
Association football goalkeepers
FC Lokomotyv Kharkiv players
FC Dynamo Kyiv players
FC Shakhtar Donetsk players
Ukrainian football managers
Soviet football managers
Ukrainian Premier League managers
FC Podillya Khmelnytskyi managers
FC Karpaty Lviv managers
MFC Mykolaiv managers
FC Krystal Kherson managers
FC Metalist Kharkiv managers
FC Torpedo Zaporizhzhia managers
FC Desna Chernihiv managers
Merited Coaches of Ukraine